Michel Boerebach (born September 27, 1963 in Amsterdam, North Holland) is a retired football midfielder from the Netherlands, who is the current assistant-coach of Dutch club where he started his professional career, Go Ahead Eagles.

Club career
A talented midfielder with Go Ahead Eagels, Boerebach left the club after 5 years for Roda JC and had an unsuccessful spell at PSV Eindhoven. Dutch manager Theo Vonk took him to La Liga side Real Burgos in 1992
, only for him to leave the club after relegation. He returned to Holland to play for FC Twente and a second spell at Go Ahead Eagles. He then played amateur football for DOVO and retired in 1999.

Managerial career
After retiring as a player, Boerebach coached the reserves team at De Graafschap and became assistant manager at Go Ahead Eagles. In February 2016 he was allowed by the Dutch FA to act as caretaker manager of their senior side for a month alongside Harry Decheiver, after Dennis Demmers was sacked.

Personal life
On 22 July 2003, Boerebach lost both his sons Lesley and Sven in a car accident near Dronten, his then wife Dora survived the crash. A youth football tournament was named in honour of Lesley and a children's farm in honour of Sven. Boerebach later wrote a book about their death, Nooit meer zaterdag (Never again Saturday).

References

External links
  Profile

1963 births
Living people
Footballers from Amsterdam
Association football midfielders
Dutch footballers
Go Ahead Eagles players
Roda JC Kerkrade players
PSV Eindhoven players
Real Burgos CF footballers
FC Twente players
Eredivisie players
Eerste Divisie players
La Liga players
Dutch expatriate footballers
Expatriate footballers in Spain
Dutch expatriate sportspeople in Spain
VV DOVO players